Tragophylloceras is an extinct genus of cephalopod belonging to the Ammonite subclass.

Distribution
Jurassic of Austria, France, Germany, Serbia and Montenegro, Spain, Switzerland, Poland and the United Kingdom.

References

Ammonitida genera
Phylloceratina
Early Jurassic ammonites of Europe
Ammonites of Europe
Pliensbachian life
Fossils of Serbia